Remission is the debut album by American heavy metal band Mastodon. It was released on May 28, 2002 through Relapse Records and was re-released on October 21, 2003.

Production
Most of the songs were written long before the album was recorded. "Workhorse" was premiered live in Memphis in July 2001. "Trampled Under Hoof", "Trilobite", "Where Strides the Behemoth", "Crusher Destroyer" and "Mother Puncher" were all played on a WFMU radio show on August 7, 2001, and "Trainwreck" was written while Eric Saner was still in the band.

At the beginning of "Crusher Destroyer" is the roar of the Tyrannosaurus rex from the film Jurassic Park with Lex saying her brother's name, "Timmy!", as they get attacked in the jeep.

Theme and cover art
Troy Sanders has said that the album's theme is the element of fire. However, Remission was Mastodon's only album not considered a concept album until 2011's The Hunter.

In an interview with online magazine Lollipop in 2004, Dailor explained how Remission was an album that helped him cope with his sister's death:

"My sister committed suicide when I was 15 (she was 14)...I was never able to put that stuff anywhere. All that pain I was carrying inside. The pain of losing her had always been there. With Today Is the Day, there was a lot of anger involved. After that, I didn't want to be angry. When I start playing in Mastodon and moved to Atlanta, there was a big personal healing. Mastodon had a lot to do with that. That's one of the main reasons that the album is titled Remission. Remission means forgiveness and healing. Mastodon helped me do that: Forgive a lot of things that happened in my life."

Re-release
The album was re-released on October 21, 2003, coinciding with a music video for "March of the Fire Ants". It had significant airplay on both Uranium and Headbangers Ball and featured dark elements such as a man being dug up and placed in a throne.

A deluxe edition of the album, folded in digipak, contained a bonus DVD with a professionally filmed nine song live set recorded at The Masquerade in Atlanta, Georgia, on December 1, 2002, along with previously unreleased material. Another additional feature is a covered song, "Emerald" by Thin Lizzy, which appears as a bonus track on the CD.

Reception

Remission received overwhelmingly positive reception. AllMusic's Brian O'Neill noted the album's "technical ecstasy" with "a complex slant that nears prog rock proportions". He also compared the "Southern-sounding" jazzy drumming and clean guitars of "Ol'e Nessie" to the Allmans.

Bryan Haywood of Pitchfork Media praised the album's production and drummer Brann Dailor as the stand-out musician. "They drop in just enough [mathematics] to keep the arrangements flavorful, but not so much as to overload the vintage guitar riffs with Dream Theater-like complexity. And then they counterbalance it with some nice, old-fashioned, Sabbath-style metal attitude." Haywood commented, "The complete package sounds timeless, but in that unbelievable way that you've never heard before."

Kerrang! named the album in their list "The 13 Most Essential Sludge Records."

Commercial performance
As of 2006, Remission has sold 49,000 units in the United States.

Song appearances
"Crusher Destroyer" was featured in the 2003 video game Tony Hawk's Underground. In 2002, "March of the Fire Ants" was included on a 7" split album with High on Fire's "Hung, Drawn and Quartered". After the Remission re-release, it was featured on the Contaminated 5.0, MTV2 Headbangers Ball, and Take Action!, Vol. 4 compilations. "Where Strides the Behemoth" was included on Contaminated 6.0 and From the Shadows – Metal for the Modern Era.

Track listing

Personnel
Troy Sanders − bass, vocals
Brent Hinds − lead guitar, vocals
Bill Kelliher − rhythm guitar
Brann Dailor − drums

References

Mastodon (band) albums
2002 debut albums
Relapse Records albums
Albums produced by Matt Bayles
Progressive metal albums by American artists
Sludge metal albums
Thrash metal albums by American artists